Nisrin Mustafa Barwari (born 1967) is an Iraqi engineer and politician of Kurdish origin. Following the end of Saddam Hussein's rule she was appointed minister of public works and municipalities which she held until 2006.

Early life and education
Barwari was born in Baghdad in 1967. Her family are of Kurdish origin from Erbil and close to the Barzani family. At age 14 she was imprisoned with her family members for one year.

Barwari is a graduate of the University of Baghdad where she received a degree in architectural engineering in 1991. She obtained a master's degree in business administration from Harvard University in 1999 and a PhD from the Technical University of Dortmund in 2015.

Career
Following her graduation Barwari left Iraq and worked at the United Nations as an engineer. She joined the Kurdistan Democratic Party and served as the minister of reconstruction and development between 1999 and 2003 in the Kurdistan Regional Government. She was also the minister for migration and refugee affairs for the Kurdistan government.

On 1 September 2003 Barwari was appointed minister of public works and municipalities to the provisional government formed by the Iraqi Governing Council. She remained in the post until 2006.

In 2005 Barwari established a non-government organization entitled Breezes of Hope of which she is the president.

Personal life
Barwari's first husband was Ghazi Al Yawer with whom she married in 2004. They later divorced, and Barwari married a man from the Barzani tribe.

References

21st-century Iraqi women politicians
21st-century Iraqi politicians
Iraqi Kurdistani politicians
Kurdistan Democratic Party politicians
University of Baghdad alumni
Harvard University alumni
Technical University of Dortmund alumni
Politicians from Baghdad
Government ministers of Iraq
Iraqi engineers
21st-century women engineers